Maurice Lévy is Chairman of the Supervisory Board of Publicis Groupe, the world's third largest advertising and communications group.

Founded in 1926, Publicis Groupe counts today over 80,000 employees and is present in over 100 countries around the world.

Career
Maurice Lévy joined Publicis in 1971, as the Director of IT. He very quickly moved into the heart of the agency's business: advertising and marketing.  

Recognizing that top clients require a full range of communications services, he began to build up a comprehensive group of specialized and general service agencies and subsidiaries in France and throughout Europe.  

Mr Lévy took personal responsibility for the international development of the Groupe and successfully managed a program of sustained international expansion that today offers Publicis Groupe's clients in 108 countries a complete range of integrated communication, advertising marketing and media services. 

He became Chairman of Publicis Conseil, the founding agency of the Groupe, in 1984, and was later named CEO of Publicis Groupe in 1987, thus becoming the company's second CEO since 1926, after Marcel Bleustein-Blanchet. 

Mr Lévy launched the annual technology conference, Viva Technology, in 2016 and has continued to lead the following editions.

In 2017 he replaced Elisabeth Badinter (Bleustein-Blanchet's daughter) as chairman of the supervisory board and was succeeded as CEO by Arthur Sadoun.

Distinctions
Maurice Lévy has been honored with numerous distinctions and accolades for his contributions to media, business leadership, and tolerance.

Private life 
Born in 1942 in Oudja, Morocco, Maurice Lévy has been married for over fifty years, and has three sons and six grandchildren. His interests include modern and contemporary art, antiques, chess and skiing.

References

Sources
Bilan, numéro 213, interview p. 60-63

External links
 

1942 births
French chief executives
French advertising executives
Living people
20th-century Moroccan Jews
People from Oujda
 New Jersey City University alumni